APOEL FC (short for Αθλητικός Ποδοσφαιρικός Όμιλος Ελλήνων Λευκωσίας, Athletikos Podosferikos Omilos Ellinon Lefkosias, literally "Athletic Football Club of Greeks of Nicosia") is a Cypriot professional football club based in Nicosia, Cyprus. APOEL is the most successful football team in Cyprus with an overall tally of 28 national championships, 21 cups, and 13 super cups.

APOEL's greatest moment in European competition occurred in the 2011–12 season, when they advanced out of the group stage of the UEFA Champions League (winning a group that included FC Porto, Shakhtar Donetsk, and Zenit St. Petersburg), then eliminated Olympique Lyonnais in the last 16, to become the first Cypriot team to reach the quarter-finals of the Champions League. APOEL's European competitions highlights also include appearances in the group stages of the 2009–10 and 2014–15 UEFA Champions League and the group stages of the 2013–14, 2015–16, and 2016–17 UEFA Europa League. They marked their most successful UEFA Europa League campaign during the 2016–17 season, when they managed to top their group (along with Olympiacos, Young Boys, and Astana) and eliminated Athletic Bilbao in the round of 32, to reach the last 16 of the competition for the first time in their history. APOEL is the only Cypriot club who have reached the group stages (and the knockout stages) of both major UEFA competitions (UEFA Champions League and UEFA Europa League). In the 2016–17 season, APOEL drew an average home league attendance of 7,126 and their highest league attendance was 15,462. Both were the highest in the league.

APOEL FC is part of the APOEL multi-sport club, which was founded in 1926 and maintains departments for several sports including football, basketball, volleyball, futsal, table tennis, bowling, cycling, archery, swimming and water polo. APOEL is one of the founding members of the Cyprus Football Association and also an ordinary member of the European Club Association, an organization that replaced the previous G-14 which consists of major football clubs in Europe.

History

1926–1929 : The early years
The club was formed as POEL (Podosferikos Omilos Ellinon Lefkosias, Football Club of Greeks of Nicosia) on 8 November 1926. The club's formation came about when a group of forty people, with a common vision, met and set the foundations for creating a football club that would represent the Greek residents of the capital and express their deep desire for Cyprus' incorporation (enosis) into Greece. The meeting took place at a traditional confectionery, owned by Charalambos Hadjioannou, downtown in Ledra Street and the first president of the club was Giorgos Poulias. The first clubhouse was the "Athenians Club" at the end of Ledra Street.

After a journey to the football club in Alexandria, Egypt in 1927 the General Assembly of 1928 decided the players showed that they were not just good footballers but also excellent track and field athletes. Hence it was decided to create a track and field team in addition to the football team. The name APOEL was adopted to reflect this, with the 'A' standing for 'Athletic'. Soon after a volleyball team and a table tennis team were established.

The 1930s : The first league titles
Cyprus did not have any country-wide league until 1932. Football clubs of the time played friendly matches only. In 1932, Pezoporikos Larnaca organised an unofficial league, the first island-wide league, and it was won by APOEL after defeating AEL Limassol in the final by 4–0. In 1934, there was a disagreement between Trust and Anorthosis Famagusta on the organisation of the fourth unofficial league. APOEL and AEL Limassol organised a meeting for the foundation of a country-wide governing body and an official country-wide league. The meeting took place in APOEL's clubhouse on 23 September and the establishment of the Cyprus Football Association was agreed. Two years later the APOEL football team celebrated its first championship title of the official Cyprus football league. APOEL also won the championship for the following four years, making this a very successful period for the club with 5 consecutive championships (1936–1940).

The 1948 conflicts
Politics, however, would soon spark conflict within the team. On 23 May 1948 the board of the club send a telegram to the Hellenic Association of Amateur Athletics, with the opportunity of the annual Panhellenic Track and Field Competition, which included wishes that "the rebellion" is finished. Several leftist club members perceived the telegram as a political comment on the Greek Civil War and they distanced themselves from the club. A few days later, on 4 June 1948, they founded AC Omonia, which until today is the archrival of APOEL and there has been a traditional animosity between the fans of the two teams.

1955–59 period
More conflicts led to further struggles for APOEL. Athletes belonging to the club frequently participated in national clashes. During the 1955–59 national uprising against the British, many of APOEL's athletes and members of the club were active members of EOKA (the National Organisation of Cypriot Fighters), the most outstanding example being the club's track and field athlete Michalakis Karaolis who was hanged by the British colonial authorities. During this period the football team had their closest brush with relegation as most football players were actively taking part in the national struggle.

Triumph in the 1963–64 UEFA Cup Winners' Cup
The football team were quickly back to full strength and made their debut in European Competitions (the first not only for APOEL but for any Cypriot team) in 1963, when they faced the Norwegian team SK Gjøvik-Lyn in the UEFA Cup Winners' Cup. Two victories for APOEL over both legs (6–0, 1–0) marked APOEL's successful European debut, as they became the first Hellenic team to progress in a European Competition. The next round against the tournament winners Sporting Clube de Portugal met APOEL with their heaviest defeat ever (16–1) and put an end to APOEL's European debut.

The successful participation in pan-Hellenic Greek Championship
Other triumphs followed in the early 1970s. In 1973 the domestic double was achieved with coach Panos Markovic. The following year APOEL became the only Cypriot team to avoid relegation from the pan-Hellenic Greek Championship. That was also the last season that the Cypriot champion played in the Greek Football League the following year due to the volatile situation in Cyprus during 1974.

The 1980s: European Cup 1986–87 withdrawal
The 1980s were a relatively fruitless period for APOEL. They have only won two championships (1980,1986), one cup (1984) and two super cups (1984, 1986). In 1986 APOEL was drawn against Beşiktaş J.K. for the second round of the European Cup. This was the first time that a Cypriot team faced a Turkish team in a European football competition. The Cypriot government prohibited APOEL from playing against the Turkish team, so APOEL was punished with two years disqualification from any UEFA competition. This penalty was later reduced to one-year.

The 1990s : The unbeaten "double" in 1995–96
The 1990s were a successful decade for APOEL with 3 championships (1990, 1992, 1996), 5 cups (1993, 1995, 1996, 1997, 1999) and 4 super cups (1992, 1993, 1996, 1999). The most successful season in the 1990s was 1995–96 in which APOEL achieved a celebratory double while remaining undefeated in the league. The basketball team won a double on the same season, making this the ideal season for a 70th anniversary celebration.

The formation of APOEL FC Company
APOEL Football (Public) Ltd was established in May 1997, after the decision of APOEL committee. This had a significant effect on the club because it separated the activities of the football team from those of the sports club. The formation of the company was necessitated by the financial difficulties the team faced at the time. The company began its operations with a capital of CY £600,000.

2000s–2010s: Domestic domination 
APOEL is the most successful football team in Cyprus since the 2000s. In seventeen years, the club won twelve championships (2002, 2004, 2007, 2009, 2011, 2013, 2014, 2015, 2016, 2017, 2018, 2019), four cups (2006, 2008, 2014, 2015) and seven super cups (2002, 2004, 2008, 2009, 2011, 2013, 2019). In the 2013–14 season, APOEL achieved a historical domestic treble by winning all the Cypriot competitions trophies, the league, the cup, and the super cup. The next season (2014–15), the club won their second consecutive double. In the 2016–17 season, APOEL managed to win their fifth consecutive league title and equalled the club's record which was set 77 years before (1936–1940).

The 2020–21 season marked the end of APOEL's dominance in Cyprus, as they failed to make the championship playoffs for the first time in the club's history. The following season, APOEL finished third, missing out on Champions League qualification in the last matchday, and instead qualifying for the Europa Conference League.

European ambitions
APOEL's first great run in European competitions came in 2002, when the team was knocked out on the third qualifying round of the UEFA Champions League, entered the UEFA Cup and reached the second round of the competition. The following years, APOEL qualified four times for the UEFA Champions League group stages (2009–10, 2011–12, 2014–15, 2017–18), and managed to reach the quarter-finals in the 2011–12 season. The team also participated in the group stages of the 2013–14, 2015–16 & 2016–17 UEFA Europa League, managing to reach the last 16 of the competition in the 2016-17 season.

APOEL FC as a company
The football department of APOEL is legally owned by APOEL Football (Public) Ltd, a public limited company, since 1997. The company's main activity is the management, operation and commercial exploitation of APOEL Football club. The company owns all the rights for the football department under an agreement with APOEL sports club and pays the club CY£100,000 annually for the privilege. The agreement between the company and the club is renewed every five years. The company has 1745 shareholders and besides the football club, also maintains a team boutique (Orange Shop), the APOELFC (FC)  magazine and the apoelfc.com.cy website among others.

Youth Academy
APOEL's youth academy is a separate legal entity from the football club. They are responsible for the under 21 teams for football, basketball and volleyball and they have their own board of directors and budget. The football academy has produced many quality Cypriot players over the years. Players started from the academy and had great contribution APOEL are: Marinos Satsias, Constantinos Charalambides, Nektarios Alexandrou, Michalis Morfis and Marios Antoniades. All of them have also competed at international level with the Cyprus national football team while Charalambides and Alexandrou have played for teams in the Greek Super League in the past.

UEFA Youth League participations

APOEL's U19 team participated for the first time in the UEFA Youth League group stage during 2014–15 season, drawn in Group F alongside Barcelona, Paris Saint-Germain and Ajax. APOEL managed to collect only one point after drawing 0–0 with Ajax at home and lost their other five Group F matches. They lost twice to Barcelona (2–3 at home, 0–3 away), lost twice to Paris Saint-Germain (0–3 at home, 0–6 away) and also lost to Ajax 1–4 away, finishing fourth in their group.

The next two seasons, APOEL's U19 team participated again in the UEFA Youth League. The 2015–16 season they competed in the first round of the Domestic Champions Path, being drawn to face Puskás Akadémia from Hungary. After a dramatic 3–3 draw in the first leg in Nicosia, APOEL U19 suffered a heavy 6–1 loss in Felcsút and were eventually eliminated. The 2016–17 season they competed in the first round of the Domestic Champions Path, being eliminated by Italian side A.S. Roma after losing 0–3 at home and 1–6 in Italy.

Colours and badge

APOEL's colours are blue and yellow. Blue symbolizes Greece and yellow symbolizes Byzantium. The logo is a blue and yellow shield with the name of the club written diagonally in blue. After the club won their 20th championship (2008–09 season), two stars were added above the logo to symbolize the 20 championship titles (one star for every ten championships won). Other than that, the badge has remained the same since the establishment of the club.

Stadium

APOEL's home ground since 23 October 1999, is the 22,859 seater GSP Stadium. It is the largest stadium in Cyprus and they share it with local rivals Omonia and Olympiakos Nicosia.

Before moving to GSP Stadium, APOEL used as home grounds the Makario Stadium (from 1978 until 1999) and the old GSP Stadium (prior to 1978).

Supporters

APOEL is one of the most popular teams in Cyprus. APOEL fans are right-wing in their majority but there are no strong ties between the organised fans and any political party. That wasn't always the case but during the past years they have actively avoided association with any political party.

The main supporter group is PAN.SY.FI. PAN.SY.FI was founded in 1979 and has branches in all major cities in Cyprus and also in other countries. The PAN.SY.FI (and most ultras) wear orange jackets (or T-shirts). The first game they sported the orange jackets was during the first-round game of the 1992–93 championship against AEL Limassol in Makario Stadium. APOEL have reserved the shirt number 79 in honour of PAN.SY.FI. (APOEL Ultras), to denote the year the group was founded, 1979.

The club record for ticket sales in a single season is 141,268 (15 matches, home league games only) during the 2010–11 season. The club record for average league games attendance in a single season is 9,582 (13 matches, home league games only) during the 2012–13 season. The club's season tickets sales record was set on season 2014–15, in which more than 8,000 season tickets were sold.

APOEL holds the record of the highest home attendance for Cyprus First Division in the game against Omonia with 23,043 tickets for 2002–03 season. The match was held at GSP Stadium on 7 December 2002 and ended in a goalless draw.

The club holds also the record of the highest attendance of a Cypriot team for a European Competition game with 22,701 tickets in the match against Olympique Lyonnais for the return leg of the 2011–12 UEFA Champions League last 16. The match which was held on 7 March 2012 at GSP Stadium of Nicosia ended with a 1–0 win for APOEL after extra time and 4–3 win on penalties.

On 8 December 2009, APOEL fans created another impressive record. More than 6,000 fans of the team travelled to London at Stamford Bridge for the last match of the 2009–10 Champions League group D against Chelsea F.C. which ended in a 2–2 draw. This is the biggest number of fans of any Cypriot team that had ever travelled away from Cyprus. A similar record created on 14 February 2012, in APOEL's participation to the 2011–12 UEFA Champions League last 16, when more than 5,000 APOEL fans travelled in France to support their team against Olympique Lyonnais. The match was held at Stade de Gerland and Olympique Lyonnais took a slender advantage into the second leg by winning 1–0. Also, on 4 April 2012, about 4,000 APOEL fans travelled to Santiago Bernabéu in Madrid, to support APOEL against Real Madrid for the return leg of the 2011–12 UEFA Champions League quarter-finals, in a match which Real Madrid won by 5–2.

During 2009–10 season APOEL sold in total 244,977 tickets for its home matches in all competitions (Championship, Cup, Champions League), which is the biggest number of tickets sold by a Cypriot club in a single season.

Rivalries

Nicosia derby

The Nicosia derby (or the Derby of the eternal enemies) refers to the Nicosia's local derby, football matches played between APOEL and Omonia. It is the classic rivalry of the Cypriot football, as the two teams are the most successful and most popular football clubs of the island. The rivalry is also indicative of social, cultural and political differences and originates from 1948 when the board of APOEL sent a telegram to the Hellenic Association of Amateur Athletics (Greek: Σ.Ε.Γ.Α.Σ.), with the opportunity of the annual Panhellenic Track and Field Competition stating its wish for the "communist mutiny" to be ended. Club's players considering this action as a political comment on the Greek Civil War distanced themselves or were expelled from APOEL and a month later they formed Omonia. The first derby was played on 12 December 1953 and ended in a goalless draw.

Current squad

Out on loan

Club officials

Board of directors

Source: apoelfc.com.cy

Personnel

Source: apoelfc.com.cy

Technical staff

Source: apoelfc.com.cy

Medical staff

Source: apoelfc.com.cy

Sponsorship

Main sponsors
 Official shirt sponsor – Pari-Match
 Official sport clothing provider – Macron
 Official host broadcaster – Cytavision
 Official back of shirt sponsor – 3CX
 Official shorts sponsor – DIMCO LTD

Source: apoelfc.com.cy

Managerial history

Last Update: 7 October 2022

 1931–1933  Antone Jean
 1933–1951  József Künsztler
 1951–1952  Pambos Avraamides
 1952–1953  Béla Guttmann
 1953–1954  Pambos Avraamidis
 1954–1955  Schwartz
 1955–1956  Hanz
 1956–1958  Kostas Talianos
 1958–1959  Takis Tsigkis
 1959–1961  Vaggelis Choumis
 1961–1962  Andreas Lazarides
 1962–1963  Jesse Carver
 1963–1964  Neil Franklin
 1964–1965  Kostas Talianos
 1965–1966  Gyula Zsengellér
 1966–1967  Lajos Szendrödi
 1967  Lykourgos Archontidis
 1967–1969  Pambos Avraamides
 1969–1970  Jesse Carver
 1970–1971  Andreas Lazarides
 1971–1972  Ray Wood
 1972–1974  Panos Markovic
 1974–1975  Andreas Lazarides
 1975  Panos Markovic
 1975–1976  Andreas Lazarides
 1976–1977  Savvas Partakis
 1977–1978  Keith Spurgeon
 1978–1981  Andreas Lazarides
 1981–1983  Mike Ferguson
 1983–1985  Panos Markovic
 1985–1989  Tommy Cassidy
 1989–1990  Giannis Matzourakis
 1990–1991  Stanko Poklepović
 1991–1993  Jacek Gmoch
 1993–1994  Takis Antoniou
 1994–1995  Giannis Matzourakis
 1995–1996  Hristo Bonev
 1996  Svetozar Šapurić
 1996–1997  Jacek Gmoch
 1997  Nikos Alefantos
 1997–1998  Kurt Jara
 1998  Andreas Mouskallis
 1998  Costas Georgiou
 1998–1999  Georgios Paraschos
 1999  Slobodan Vučeković
 1999–2000  Andreas Michaelides
 2000  Svetozar Šapurić
 2000  Markos Markou
 2000–2001  Mike Walker
 2001–2002  Eugène Gerards
 2002–2003  Takis Lemonis
 2003  Dušan Uhrin
 2003–2005  Ivan Jovanović
 2005  Werner Lorant
 2005  Marios Constantinou
 2005–2006  Jerzy Engel
 2006–2008  Marinos Ouzounidis
 2008–2013  Ivan Jovanović
 2013  Paulo Sérgio
 2013–2015  Giorgos Donis
 2015  Thorsten Fink
 2015  Domingos Paciência
 2015–2016  Temur Ketsbaia
 2016–2017  Thomas Christiansen 
 2017  Mario Been
 2017–2018  Giorgos Donis
 2018  Bruno Baltazar
 2018–2019  Paolo Tramezzani
 2019  Thomas Doll
 2019  Loukas Hadjiloukas (interim) 
 2019–2020  Kåre Ingebrigtsen
 2020  Marinos Ouzounidis
 2020–2021  Mick McCarthy
 2021  Savvas Poursaitidis
 2021–2022  Sofronis Avgousti
 2022–  Vladan Milojević

Presidential history
APOEL has had numerous presidents over the course of their history. Since the establishment of APOEL Football Ltd, the presidents of the board of directors of the company (chairmen) have assumed all presidential duties for the football club. Here are complete lists of both:

Presidents:
 1926–1958 – Georgios Poulias
 1958–1967 – Εfthyvoulos Αnthoullis
 1967–1968 – Michalakis Triantafyllides
 1968–1969 – Takis Skarparis
 1969–1971 – Constantinos Loukos
 1971–1974 – Michalakis Zivanaris
 1974–1975 – Kikis Lazarides
 1975–1983 – Iakovos Filippou
 1983–1988 – Michalakis Zivanaris
 1988–1991 – Andreas Papaellinas
 1991–1992 – Kykkos Fotiades
 1992–1994 – Mike Ioannides
 1994–1996 – Christos Triantafyllides
 1996–1999 – Ouranios Ioannides
 1999–2000 – Dinos Palmas
 2002–2004 – Dinos Fisentzides
 2004–2007 – Yiannos Ioannou
 2007–2008 – Costas Schizas
 2008–2009 – Christodoulos Ellinas
 2009–2011 – Prodromos Petrides
 2011–2012 – Aris Vasilopoulos
 2012–2014 – Christoforos Potamitis
 2014–2016 – Marios Charalambous
 2016–present – Christoforos Potamitis

Chairmen:
 1997–1998 – Mike Ioannides
 1998–2000 – Christos Triantafyllides
 2000–2001 – Harris Papanastasiou
 2001–2006 – Prodromos Petrides
 2006–2008 – Kyriakos Zivanaris
 2008–2013 – Phivos Erotokritou
 2013–present – Prodromos Petrides

Former players

List of former players with national team appearances or having won multiple titles with the club:

 Cyprus
  Marios Agathokleous (2001–2003)
  Takis Antoniou (1972–1986)
  Aristos Aristokleous (1990–2001)
  Constantinos Charalambides (1997–2004, 2008–2016)
  Zacharias Charalambous (2001–2005)
  Andreas Christodoulou (1966–1970)
  Georgios Christodoulou (1995–2002)
  Costas Costa (1989–1999)
  Costas Fasouliotis (1990–2000)
  Demetris Daskalakis (2000–2008)
  Marios Elia (1998–2014)
  Stavros Georgiou (2002–2007)
  Loukas Hadjiloukas (1987–2000)
  Yiannos Ioannou (1981–2000)
  Nikakis Kantzilieris (1961–1972)
  Constantinos Makrides (2004–2008, 2015)
  Costas Malekkos (2001–2005)
  Markos Markou (1973–1978)
  Costas Miamiliotis (1977–1989, 1992–1994)
  Chrysis Michael (2003–2011)
  Michalis Morfis (1999–2010)
  Marios Neophytou (2004–2007)
  Stelios Okkarides (1997–1998, 2001–2007)
  Nikodimos Papavasiliou (2002–2003)
  Giorgos Pantziaras (1971–1978, 1985–1987)
  Nicos Pantziaras (1972–1987)
  Koullis Pantziaras (1976–1992)
  Andros Petrides (1984–2000)
  Marinos Satsias (1995–2014)
  Georgios Savva (1949–1955, 1956–1961)
  Athos Solomou (2009–2014)
  Andreas Sotiriou (1986–1998, 2001)
  Andreas Stylianou (1963–1978)
  Pieros Sotiriou (2013–2017)
  Diomidis Symeonidis (1926–1929, 1934–1935)
  Nicos Timotheou (1992–1993, 1994–2001)
  Yiasoumis Yiasoumi (1998–2001)

 Albania
  Altin Haxhi (2008–2010)

 Algeria
  Rafik Djebbour (2014–2015)

 Argentina
  Fernando Cavenaghi (2015–2016)
  Esteban Solari (2005–2007, 2010–2012)
  Tomás De Vincenti (2014–2016)

 Armenia
  Romik Khachatryan (2002–2003)

 Australia
  Paul Okon (2005–2006)

 Austria
  Alfred Hörtnagl (1997)
  Christoph Westerthaler (1997)

 Belarus
   Renan Bressan (2016–2017)

 Bosnia and Herzegovina
   Sanel Jahić

 Brazil
  Aílton Almeida (2010–2012)
  William Boaventura (2010–2012)
  Carlão (2014–2017)
  Zé Carlos (2007–2008)
  João Guilherme (2013–2016)
  Kaká (2011–2012, 2014–2015)
  Gustavo Manduca (2010–2015)
  Veridiano Marcelo (1998–2000)
  Marcinho (2010–2012)
  Emerson Moisés Costa (2007)
  Marcelo Oliveira (2011–2014)
  Jean Paulista (2008–2010)
  César Santin (2014)
  Marcos Tavares (2007)

 Colombia
  Hamilton Ricard (2004–2005)

 Costa Rica
  Rónald Gómez (2006–2007)

 Croatia
  Ardian Kozniku (1997)

 Czech Republic
  Tomáš Votava (2003–2004)

 Denmark
  Mikkel Beckmann (2013)

 England
  Chris Bart-Williams (2004–2005)
  Dave Esser (1982–1983)
  Terry McDermott (1985–1987)
  Ian Moores (1983–1988)
  Gary Owen (1988–1989)

 France
  Bark Seghiri (2006–2009)

 Germany
  Martin Lanig (2015)

 Ghana
  Ebenezer Hagan (2005)

 Greece
  Georgios Amanatidis (2003–2004)
  Dionisis Chiotis (2008–2015)
  Giannis Gianniotas (2016–2017)
  Alexandros Kaklamanos (2005–2006)
  Michalis Kapsis (2007–2008)
  Christos Karipidis (2012–2013)
  Christos Kontis (2006–2011)
  Nikos Machlas (2006–2008)
  Spiros Marangos (2000–2002)
  Marinos Ouzounidis (2001–2003)
  Anastasios Papazoglou (2014–2015)
  Savvas Poursaitides (2008–2012)
  Miltiadis Sapanis (2007–2008)
  Ilias Solakis (2001–2002)
  Alexandros Tziolis (2012–2013)
  Georgios Vakouftsis (2002–2005)

 Hungary
  József Kiprich (1995–1997)
  Kálmán Kovács (1995–1996)
  István Kozma (1995–1997)
  Barnabás Sztipánovics (2002–2003)
  Roland Sallai (2017–2018)
  Norbert Balogh (2018–2019)

 Ireland
  Cillian Sheridan (2013–2015)

 Israel
  Dudu Biton (2013)
 Jordan
  Musa Al-Taamari (2018–2020)
 North Macedonia
  Boban Grnčarov (2009–2011)
  Goran Lazarevski (2000–2001)
  Jane Nikolovski (2007–2008)
  Milan Stojanovski (2004–2005)
  Ivan Tričkovski (2010–2012)

 Morocco
  Mohammed Chaouch (1999–2000)

 Netherlands
  Joost Broerse (2008–2011)
  John van Loen (1998)

 Nigeria
  Michael Obiku (2000)
  Benjamin Onwuachi (2008–2009)

 Northern Ireland
  Tommy Cassidy (1983–1985)

 Norway
  John Arne Riise (2014–2015)

 Paraguay
  Aldo Adorno (2011–2014)

 Peru
  Alfonso Dulanto (1997–1998)

 Poland
  Kamil Kosowski (2008–2010)
  Wojciech Kowalczyk (2003–2004)
  Marcin Żewłakow (2008–2010)

 Portugal
  Paulo Costa (2009)
  Ricardo Fernandes (2005–2008)
  Tiago Gomes (2013–2015)
  Paulo Jorge (2009–2012)
  Daniel Kenedy (2005)
  Hélio Pinto (2006–2013)
  Mário Sérgio (2012–2016)

 Romania
  Daniel Florea (2006–2009)

 Serbia
  Dragiša Binić (1993–1994)
  Siniša Gogić (1989–1993, 2000–2002)
  Saša Jovanović (2005–2006)
  Vesko Mihajlović (1993–1994)
  Nenad Mirosavljević (2008–2011)
  Svetozar Šapurić (1989–1993, 1995–1996)

 Slovakia
  Mário Breška (2009–2010)
  Branislav Rzeszoto (2004–2005)

 Slovenia
  Alfred Jermaniš (1996–1997)
  Miran Pavlin (2004–2005)

 Togo
  Jean-Paul Abalo (2006)

 Tunisia
  Tijani Belaid (2011–2012)
   Selim Benachour (2012–2014)

Honours
 Cypriot Championship
 Winners (28) (record): 1935–36, 1936–37, 1937–38, 1938–39, 1939–40, 1946–47, 1947–48, 1948–49, 1951–52, 1964–65, 1972–73, 1979–80, 1985–86, 1989–90, 1991–92, 1995–96, 2001–02, 2003–04, 2006–07, 2008–09, 2010–11, 2012–13, 2013–14, 2014–15, 2015–16, 2016–17, 2017–18, 2018–19

 Cypriot Cup
 Winners (21) (record): 1936–37, 1940–41, 1946–47, 1950–51, 1962–63, 1967–68, 1968–69, 1972–73, 1975–76, 1977–78, 1978–79, 1983–84, 1992–93, 1994–95, 1995–96, 1996–97, 1998–99, 2005–06, 2007–08, 2013–14, 2014–15

 Cypriot Super Cup
 Winners (14): 1963, 1984, 1986, 1992, 1993, 1996, 1997, 2002, 2004, 2008, 2009, 2011, 2013, 2019

Records
Last update: 16 March 2017

 Record League win: 17–1 vs  Aris Limassol (4 June 1967) — 1966–67
 Record League defeat: 6–1 vs  Nea Salamina (2 May 1998) — 1997–98
 Record European competition win: 6–0 vs  SK Gjøvik-Lyn (8 September 1963) — UEFA Cup Winners' Cup, Preliminary round 1st leg, 1963–64  6–0 vs  HB Tórshavn (28 August 1997) — UEFA Cup Winners' Cup, Qualifying round 2nd leg, 1997–98
 Record European competition defeat: 16–1 vs  Sporting CP (13 November 1963) — UEFA Cup Winners' Cup, 1st round 1st leg, 1963–64
 Most consecutive League games unbeaten: 34 — From 18 September 1946 to 23 November 1949
 Most consecutive League games won: 16 — From 21 December 2008 to 11 April 2009
 Most League points in a season:
 3 for win: 83, 2015–16 (full season) — 69, 2008–09 (regular season)
 2 for win: 51, 1976–77
 Most League goals in a season: 91, 2015–16
 Record average League home attendance: 9,582 — 2012–13
 Record League home attendance: 23,043 vs  Omonia (7 December 2002) — 2002–03
 Record European competition home attendance: 22,701 vs  Olympique Lyonnais (7 March 2012) — UEFA Champions League, Last-16 2nd leg, 2011–12
 Most League appearances for club: 371 —  Yiannos Ioannou
 Most League goals for club : 191 —  Yiannos Ioannou
 Most European competitions appearances for club: 91 —  Nuno Morais
 Most European competitions goals for club : 9 —  Aílton José Almeida

League and Cup history

IFFHS Club world ranking

Last update: 7 January 2015
 Source: IFFHS

References

External links

Official website 
APOEL Athletic Football Club official website 
APOEL Ultras official website 

 
APOEL Nicosia
Association football clubs established in 1926
1926 establishments in Cyprus
Football clubs in Cyprus
Multi-sport clubs in Cyprus
Football clubs in Nicosia
Unrelegated association football clubs